The following is a list of state highways in the U.S. state of Louisiana designated in the 3100–3149 range.


Louisiana Highway 3100

Louisiana Highway 3100 (LA 3100) runs  in a general east–west direction from US 165 Bus. to the junction of US 167 and LA 28 in Pineville.  The route has a spur that travels  along Donohue Ferry Road from LA 3100 to Expressway Drive.

LA 3100 heads northeast from US 165 Bus. (Military Highway) just north of the latter's entrance to Louisiana College.  It travels along Donohue Ferry Road through a residential neighborhood.  After crossing over the Kansas City Southern Railway (KCS) line, LA 3100 intersects LA 3100 Spur at Griffith Street.  The spur route proceeds north on Donohue Ferry Road while LA 3100 turns southeast onto Griffth Street as signs direct motorists toward LA 28.  LA 3100 proceeds a short distance past Lessie Moore Elementary School to a diamond interchange with US 167 and LA 28, connecting to Alexandria, Winnfield, and Jonesville.  LA 3100 is an undivided two-lane highway with a center turning lane for its entire length.

LA 3100 was added to the state highway system in 1964, creating a state-maintained connection between the new Pineville Expressway and US 165 Bus. (Military Highway) along existing roadways.

Louisiana Highway 3101

Louisiana Highway 3102

Louisiana Highway 3103

Louisiana Highway 3103 (LA 3103) ran  in an east–west direction, looping off of US 84 in Mansfield, DeSoto Parish.

The route followed a short section of US 84 bypassed in the 1960s.  From the west, LA 3103 headed northeast on Kings Highway past Mansfield High School, then curved due east onto McEnery Street.  After crossing the present alignment of US 84 and US 171, the route continued a short distance to the contemporary alignment at Washington Avenue, now designated as US 84 Business.

Louisiana Highway 3104

Louisiana Highway 3104 (LA 3104) runs  in a north–south direction from LA 8 to the concurrent US 84/LA 772 in Midway, LaSalle Parish. It is an undivided two-lane highway for its entire length.

Louisiana Highway 3105

Louisiana Highway 3105 (LA 3105) runs  in a north–south direction from Arthur Ray Teague Parkway to the end of state maintenance at the northern boundary of the Bossier City city limits in Bossier Parish.

The route heads northeast on McDade Street, becoming Airline Drive at an intersection with US 71. It crosses the Kansas City Southern railroad tracks, curving to the north-northwest and intersecting LA 72. Shortly after, it has a diamond interchange with I-20 (unsigned on I-20). It intersects the concurrent US 79/US 80 and curves to the north shortly after, having another diamond interchange with I-220. The route ends  later at the northern boundary of the Bossier City city limits, while Airline Drive continues north. LA 3105 is an undivided four-lane highway, except for its interchanges at I-20 and I-220 where it briefly becomes divided.

Louisiana Highway 3107

Louisiana Highway 3107 (LA 3107) ran  in an east–west direction along Talbot Avenue from LA 309 west of Thibodaux to LA 20 in Thibodaux, Lafourche Parish.

The route headed east from LA 309 (Brule Guillot Road) in an area known as Brule.  En route to Thibodaux, it intersected LA 3185 (West Thibodaux Bypass Road).  Near the end of its route it briefly crossed into Terrebonne Parish before re-entering Lafourche Parish.  LA 3107 then reached its eastern terminus at LA 20 (Canal Boulevard) in Thibodaux, just north of Schriever.

LA 3107 was an undivided two-lane highway for its entire length.

Louisiana Highway 3112

Louisiana Highway 3112 (LA 3112) runs 1.64 miles in an east–west direction, from LA 109 in Vinton and ending near Toomey in western Calcasieu Parish, near the Louisiana-Texas border.

In 2017 it was proposed for deletion as part of La DOTD's Road Transfer program.

Louisiana Highway 3113

Louisiana Highway 3113 (LA 3113) ran  in an east–west direction, connecting Port Hudson National Cemetery with US 61 north of Baton Rouge, East Baton Rouge Parish.  It was an undivided two-lane highway for its entire length.

The route was deleted in 2018 as part of the La DOTD's Road Transfer program.

Louisiana Highway 3114

Louisiana Highway 3115

Louisiana Highway 3115 (LA 3115) runs  in a north–south direction from LA 75 to LA 74 in St. Gabriel, Iberville Parish.

The route heads northeast from LA 75, which follows the east bank levee of the Mississippi River, and passes a series of industrial facilities in an otherwise rural area within the St. Gabriel city limits.  After intersecting LA 30, the highway reaches its terminus at LA 74.  Both routes connect St. Gabriel with the nearby I-10 and US 61 corridors.  LA 3115 is an undivided two-lane highway for its entire length.

Louisiana Highway 3116

Louisiana Highway 3118

Louisiana Highway 3120

Louisiana Highway 3120 (LA 3120) runs  in a northwest to southeast direction from LA 18 to LA 70 east of Donaldsonville, Ascension Parish.

The route is a short connector, originally constructed around 1964 as part of LA 3089.  It was the main route connecting Donaldsonville with the Sunshine Bridge across the Mississippi River until LA 3089 was re-routed and extended directly into town in the mid-1970s.  LA 3120 is an undivided two-lane highway for its entire length.

Louisiana Highway 3121

Louisiana Highway 3121 (LA 3121) runs  in a north–south direction from the LA 15 in Spearsville to LA 558 at Lockhart.  The route has a spur that travels  from LA 3121 to a dead end at the village's abandoned school property.  A second spur was renumbered as LA 3269 in the early 1990s.

Louisiana Highway 3123

Louisiana Highway 3123 (LA 3123) is a two-lane state highway that travels just south of the city limits of Eunice in Acadia Parish. It begins at LA 755 in front of the Louisiana State University at Eunice campus. The highway heads to the southeast passing the entrance to Eunice Airport then passing some homes before curving to the east. Near its end, LA 3123 intersects LA 3116, crosses a railroad at-grade, and ends at LA 13.

Louisiana Highway 3124

Louisiana Highway 3125

Louisiana Highway 3125 (LA 3125) runs  in an east–west direction from LA 70 south of Sorrento to the junction of LA 641 and LA 3213 east of Gramercy.

The route spans the distance between the approaches to two bridges across the Mississippi River, the Sunshine Bridge on LA 70 and the Gramercy Bridge on LA 3213.  It is a two-lane highway that provides a bypass of the older and winding River Road (LA 44), facilitating truck traffic through the industrial corridor along the river.  Along the way, LA 3125 cuts across a sharp bend in the river at Convent.  Near the end of its route, it passes through the adjacent unincorporated communities of Lutcher and Gramercy, terminating just south of a junction with US 61 (Airline Highway).

Louisiana Highway 3127

Louisiana Highway 3128

Louisiana Highway 3130

Louisiana Highway 3131

Louisiana Highway 3131 (LA 3131) ran  in a north–south direction along Hospital Road in New Roads, Pointe Coupee Parish, connecting to LA 1 at either end.

The route served as a bypass of the downtown area and developed as a modern commercial corridor for the small city.  Its local name, Hospital Road, reflects the presence of the Pointe Coupee General Hospital at its southern terminus.  The construction of the nearby John James Audubon Bridge over the Mississippi River led to a reconfiguration of highway routes in the area.  LA 3131 became part of mainline LA 1 with the old route through town designated as LA 1 Business.

Louisiana Highway 3132

Louisiana Highway 3134

Louisiana Highway 3136

Louisiana Highway 3136 (LA 3136) runs  in a general north–south direction (signed east–west) from Parish Road 817 to LA 34 in Atlanta, Winn Parish.  It is an undivided two-lane highway for its entire length.

Louisiana Highway 3137

Louisiana Highway 3137 (LA 3137) runs  in a general north–south direction along English Turn Road, looping off of LA 39 opposite the Mississippi River from Belle Chasse, Plaquemines Parish.  It was the original route of LA 39 before the present cut-off opened around 1968.  LA 3137 is an undivided two-lane highway for its entire length.

Louisiana Highway 3139

Louisiana Highway 3140

Louisiana Highway 3140 (LA 3140) runs  in an east–west direction off of US 61 (Airline Highway) southeast of Sorrento, Ascension Parish.  The route is located just north of Exit 187 on I-10 and provides access to several petroleum industry facilities.  It is an undivided two-lane highway for its entire length.

Louisiana Highway 3141

Louisiana Highway 3141 (LA 3141) runs  in a southwest to northeast direction along Mary Plantation Road from LA 3127 to LA 18 (River Road) in Killona, St. Charles Parish.  The route connects Killona with LA 3127, a highway constructed in the 1970s that bypasses the various communities along the west bank of the Mississippi River between Luling and Donaldsonville.  It is an undivided two-lane highway for its entire length.

Louisiana Highway 3142

Louisiana Highway 3142 (LA 3142) runs  in a southwest to northeast direction from LA 3127 to LA 18 (River Road) in Taft, St. Charles Parish.

The route connects the industrial area of Taft with LA 3127, a highway constructed in the 1970s that bypasses the various communities along the west bank of the Mississippi River between Luling and Donaldsonville.  The Dow Chemical Company and Waterford 3 nuclear power plant are among the facilities served by the highway.  LA 3142 crosses the Union Pacific Railroad (UP) tracks by way of an overpass.  It is an undivided two-lane highway for its entire length.

Louisiana Highway 3143

Louisiana Highway 3144

Louisiana Highway 3144 (LA 3144) runs  in a general north–south direction along Edgewood Drive from US 165 Business to LA 28 in Pineville, Rapides Parish.

The route heads north from LA 28 and passes through a wooded area of mixed residential and commercial establishments.  After curving due west, LA 3144 passes through a diamond interchange with US 167 (Pineville Expressway).  It proceeds a short distance further to its terminus at US 165 Business (Military Highway).  LA 3144 is an undivided two-lane highway for its entire length.

Louisiana Highway 3146

Louisiana Highway 3146 (LA 3146) ran  in an east–west direction along Colonial Boulevard from LA 46 (East St. Bernard Highway) to LA 39 (East Judge Perez Drive) in Violet, St. Bernard Parish.  It was a temporary connector between the original and current routes of LA 39 in the 1970s and 1980s.

In 1975, LA 39 was re-routed onto a newly opened extension of Judge Perez Drive from LA 47 (Paris Road) in Chalmette to a dead end at the Violet Canal, pending construction of a further extension from Violet to Poydras.  During this time, traffic was routed onto Colonial Boulevard to connect the end of the new LA 39 (East Judge Perez Drive) with the existing LA 39 (East St. Bernard Highway, now LA 46).  The Violet Canal bridge and extension of Judge Perez Drive to Poydras was opened in 1981, and LA 3146 was deleted sometime afterward.

Louisiana Highway 3147

Louisiana Highway 3148

Louisiana Highway 3149

References

External links
La DOTD State, District, and Parish Maps